State Route 119 (SR 119) is part of Maine's system of numbered state highways, located in the southwestern part of the state. Its southern terminus in Minot is at State Route 11 and State Route 121, and its northern terminus in South Paris is at State Routes 26 and 117. Its northernmost  are cosigned with SR 117 in a wrong-way concurrency.

Route description
SR 119 begins at Minot Avenue (SR 11 / SR 121) in the town of Minot, located on the Androscoggin River near the border with Auburn.  The highway proceeds north through Minot before intersecting with SR 124.  The two highways have a brief concurrency before SR 119 turns northwest and enters the town of Hebron.  The highway cuts right through the heart of town and continues northwest towards Paris.  SR 119 enters Paris from the southeast and heads straight into downtown.  Near the center of town, SR 119 intersects SR 117 which approaches from the northeast.  The SR 119 designation continues along SR 117 for another , in a wrong-way concurrency, before reaching SR 26.  SR 119 ends while SR 117 turns south along SR 26 towards Norway.

History
When it was first commissioned in 1925, SR 119 occupied a completely different routing than it does today, running from SR 117 in Harrison to SR 118 in Waterford.  The route was renumbered to SR 35 when it was first designated in the early 1930s.  The current SR 119 from Minot to Paris was designated in 1935 and has not changed since.

Junction list

References

119
Transportation in Oxford County, Maine
Transportation in Androscoggin County, Maine
Paris, Maine